Akhileshwar Pathak is a professor of business law at the Indian Institute of Management, Ahmedabad.

Education
He holds a doctorate in law from University of Edinburgh, U.K. and an LL.B. from the Delhi University.

Areas of interest
His areas of research interest are corporate law, globalisation and liberalisation of India.

Books
Contested domains: the state, peasants, and forests in contemporary India (SAGE Publications, 1994)
Law, strategies, ideologies: legislating forests in colonial India (Oxford University Press, 2002)

References

External links
Akhileshwar Pathak at Penguin India

Academic staff of the Indian Institute of Management Ahmedabad
Year of birth missing (living people)
Living people